Roc and a Hard Place is the nineteenth book of the Xanth series by Piers Anthony.

Plot
One year after the events of Geis of the Gargoyle, Demoness Metria, whilst making her husband Veleno deliriously happy, finds that the stork will not acknowledge her summons. Seeking to summon the stork, Metria (and her worse half, D. Mentia) are sent on a quest by the Good Magician Humphrey. Metria is then tasked by the Simurgh to deliver a bag's worth of summons to their respective citizens of Xanth in order to hold a trial for Roxanne Roc. All that remains is to find out why Roxanne Roc is on trial as Metria meets with many old Xanth characters, including Grundy Golem, Sorceress Iris, Magician Trent, Gray Murphy, Jordan the Barbarian and Desiree Dryad.

References

 19
1995 American novels
1996 fantasy novels
Tor Books books